Juan Martínez de Irujo (born 4 November 1981)  is a professional Basque pelota player for the Aspe team.

Early life
Martínez de Irujo was born in 1981 in Ibero, Olza. He is the son of Juan Angel Martinez de Irujo and the nephew of the late professional pelotari (pelota player) Javier Martínez de Irujo.

Professional career
Martinez de Irujo made his debut on the Labrit fronton in 2003, and soon became an important player, winning the Hand-pelota championship and runner-up with Lasa III on the doubles tournament held the same year. In 2005 he was again runner-up of the 1st hand-pelota championship, but won the doubles with Goñi III.
In 2006 he won the three pelota titles: hand single, hand doubles and Cuatro y Medio like Julián Rategui had done back in 1990.
In 2008 he was again runner-up at cuatro y medio to Olaizola II. In 2009 he again won the doubles championship along with Fernando Goñi, and won his third single hand-pelota title against Olaizola II.

1st Hand-pelota championship finals

Doubles hand-pelota championship finals

Cuatro y Medio Euskadi Championships

References

Spanish pelotaris
1981 births
Living people
People from Cuenca de Pamplona
Pelotaris from Navarre